The Crandon Institute is a private bilingual Methodist school in Montevideo, Uruguay. Crandon was founded in 1879 by teacher Cecilia Güelfi as the Liceo Evangélico, or Evangelical High School, and was the first school in the country with roots in the Evangelical movement. 

Renamed Crandon Institute in 1906 as a tribute to the American Methodist Mrs. Frank P. Crandon, it occupies a central location on the corner of 8 de Octubre Avenue and Garibald in Barrio La Blanqueada, Montevideo.

Profile
Crandon provides classes at both the primary and secondary level and is best known for the strength of its English learning provision and courses in Home Economics. Since 1957 the gastronomy department has been responsible for publishing the Uruguayan bestseller the Crandon Institute Cooking Manual.

By 2016 the school had 1,500 students across all levels. In common with other private schools in Uruguay, demand for places has increased in recent years due to the growth in expatriates from Argentina leaving their home country for tax reasons. The current director is Professor Carlos Varela.

References

External links
 

1879 establishments in Uruguay
Educational institutions established in 1879
La Blanqueada
Methodist schools
Christian schools in Uruguay
Schools in Montevideo
Methodism in Uruguay
Private schools in Uruguay